is an important English tort law, company law and contract law case. It held that for there to be an effective assumption of responsibility, there must be some direct or indirect conveyance that a director had done so, and that a claimant had relied on the information. Otherwise only a company itself, as a separate legal person, would be liable for negligent information.

Facts
Mr Williams and his partner approached Natural Life Health Foods Ltd with a proposal. They wanted to get a franchise for a health food shop in Rugby (i.e. they wanted to use the Natural Life brand to run a new store and pay Natural Life Ltd a fixed fee). Mr Williams was given a brochure with financial projections. They entered the scheme. They failed, and lost money. So Mr Williams sued the company, alleging that the advice they got was negligent. However, before the suit could be completed, Natural Life Health Foods Ltd went into liquidation. So Mr Williams sought to hold the company's managing director and main shareholder personally liable. This was Mr Mistlin, who in the brochure had been held out as having a lot of expertise. Mr Mistlin had made the brochure projections, but had not been in any of the negotiations with Mr Williams.

The High Court allowed Mr Williams claim, and so did the Court of Appeal by a majority. The company and Mr Mistlin appealed to the House of Lords.

Judgment
The House of Lords held unanimously that Mr Williams' claim would fail. They emphasised that there had been no separate assumption of responsibility directly to Mr Williams, and no requisite reliance. Lord Steyn's judgment was as follows.

See also

Lister v Romford Ice & Cold Storage Co Ltd [1957] AC 555
Professional negligence

Notes

United Kingdom company case law
English tort case law
English privity case law
English enforceability case law
House of Lords cases
1998 in case law
1998 in British law